Tuomas Pohjanpalo (3 March 1861 – 27 February 1933; surname until 1906 Friis) was a Finnish industrialist and politician, born in Kalajoki. He was a member of the Parliament of Finland from 1907 to 1909, representing the Finnish Party.

References

1861 births
1933 deaths
People from Kalajoki
People from Oulu Province (Grand Duchy of Finland)
Finnish Party politicians
Members of the Parliament of Finland (1907–08)
Members of the Parliament of Finland (1908–09)